The City of Wakefield is a local government district with the status of a city and metropolitan borough in West Yorkshire, England. Wakefield, the largest settlement, is the administrative centre of the district.  The population of the City of Wakefield at the 2011 Census was 325,837. The district includes the Five Towns of Castleford, Featherstone, Knottingley, Normanton and Pontefract. Other towns include Hemsworth, Horbury, Ossett, South Elmsall and South Kirkby (also forms the civil parish of South Kirkby and Moorthorpe). The city and district are governed by Wakefield Metropolitan District Council from the County Hall.

In 2010, Wakefield was named as the UK's third most musical city by PRS for Music.

Economy
The economic and physical condition of several of the former mining towns and villages in Wakefield District have started to improve due to the booming economy of Leeds – and an increase in numbers of commuters to the city from the sub-region – and a recognition of undeveloped assets. For instance Castleford, to the North East of Wakefield is seeing extensive development and investment because of the natural asset of its outlook on to the River Aire, its easy access to the national motorway network and the availability of former mining land for house-building. In Ossett, house prices have risen from an average of £50,000 in 1998 to £130,000 in 2003.

Although unemployment was amongst the highest in the country for most of the 1980s, and 1990s, Wakefield District now has below-average unemployment. The "Wakefield East" ward had 4.7% unemployment in May 2005 (source: Office for National Statistics)—which was more than 1% higher than any other ward.  The eastern half of the district remains considerably less prosperous than the western half, with several deprived wards

The district is mainly made out of old coal-mining towns, although other industries include wool, chemicals, machine tools, glass and other forms of manufacturing.  Horbury is something of an anomaly in having had an iron works. When Margaret Thatcher came to power in 1979 there were 21 pits in the district. By the time the 1984 Strike began this had decreased to 15, however it still had more collieries than any other district in the country. At the time of privatisation in November 1994, only two remained: the Prince of Wales at Pontefract, which closed in 2002, and Kellingley at Knottingley which closed in 2015 ending the industry that once dominated the district.  Most of the district's pits had been very hardline during the 1984 strike.

History
The former Borough of Wakefield was raised to city status by letters patent in 1888.  It became a county borough in 1913, taking it out of the jurisdiction of the West Riding County Council. The present boundaries were set in 1974 by the Local Government Act 1972, when the County Borough of Wakefield merged with the West Riding municipal boroughs of Castleford, Ossett and Pontefract, the urban districts of Featherstone, Hemsworth, Horbury, Knottingley, Normanton and Stanley, along with Wakefield Rural District and parts of Hemsworth Rural District and Osgoldcross Rural District. The new metropolitan district's city status was reconfirmed by letters patent in 1974. The Council's headquarters is County Hall, originally built for the West Riding County Council and acquired by Wakefield in 1989.

Geography

Green belt

The district is within a green belt region that extends into the surrounding counties  that is in place to reduce urban sprawl, prevent the cities and towns in the West Yorkshire Urban Area conurbation from convergence, protect the identity of outlying communities, encourage brownfield reuse, and preserve the countryside. It restricts inappropriate development within the designated areas and imposes stricter conditions on permitted building. Green belt surrounds the Wakefield built up area and stretches into the wider borough and outlying towns and villages. Walton, Netherton, Castleford, Knottingley, and Pontefract are surrounded by it. Smaller villages, hamlets and rural areas such as Warmfield and Heath, Stanley Ferry, Newmillerdam, Snydale, Wintersett, and Chapelthorpe are included in the designation.

Governance

The district is divided into 21 wards, each represented on Wakefield Metropolitan District Council by three councillors. Councillors are elected on a first past the post basis, usually for a four-year period which is staggered so that only one councillor per ward is up for election at any one time. Exceptions include by-elections and ward boundary changes.

Wakefield Metropolitan District wards

Elections

The city was the safest Labour council in England in 2003, but there was a short-lived swing against Labour in recent years.  After the 2008 election results the Labour Party had a majority of just one. However the death of Labour councillor Graham Phelps meant that the authority was for a time in no overall control. Labour did however, hold the seat in the by-election in January 2010 restoring their majority.

In the May 2010 local elections Labour held all of their seats and made a net gain of one seat from the Independents increasing Labour's majority on the Council to three. Following the defection of an Independent to Labour, Labour's majority was increased to 5. In January 2011 a Conservative Councillor defected to become an independent Councillor, leaving the Tories with 23 seats.

In May 2011 Labour increased their majority on the council to 15 making 5 gains, taking 3 seats from the Conservatives (Horbury and South Ossett, Pontefract South and Wrenthorpe and Outwood West), and 2 from the Independents (Featherstone and South Elmsall and South Kirkby). The Conservatives gained Ossett from the Liberal Democrats.

Following the local elections held on 5 May 2022, in which Labour and the Liberal Democrats each gained a seat from the Conservatives, the composition of the current Council is Labour 45, Conservatives 13, Liberal Democrats 3, and 2 Independents.

Demography

Sports

The city district is home to three professional rugby league clubs, the Wakefield Trinity, Castleford Tigers who both play in the Super League and Featherstone Rovers who play in the Kingstone Press Championship. All three have had periods of success. The city also has several amateur rugby league clubs including Featherstone Lions and Normanton Knights. Current England rugby league internationals from the area include; Tom Briscoe, Rob Burrow, Zak Hardaker, and Brett Ferres. The district is also home to three clubs in the Northern Premier League: Frickley Athletic F.C. at South Elmsall, Ossett United and Pontefract Collieries.

The district has a strong heritage of cricket with former Yorkshire and England captain Geoffrey Boycott born in Fitzwilliam and current Yorkshire and England cricketer Tim Bresnan from Pontefract.

Social aspects
A decision was made, in 2004, to transfer the district's extensive council housing to Wakefield and District Housing (WDH), an 'independent' housing association, who would be more efficient with repairs and maintaining decent accommodation; as council housing represented almost 30% of the district, this was the second-largest stock transfer in British history.  WDH are investing over £700 million to regenerate the District and working with partners, such as WMDC, are investing in new housing within the District.

See also
List of people from Wakefield
The Ridings Centre
Wakefield Trinity L.F.C.

References

 
Cities in Yorkshire and the Humber
Leeds City Region
Local government districts in West Yorkshire
Metropolitan boroughs